Emanuele Birarelli (born 8 February 1981) is an Italian volleyball player, a member of Italy men's national volleyball team and Italian club Sir Safety Perugia, silver medalist of 2016 Summer Olympics, bronze medalist of 2012 Summer Olympics and participant of the Olympic Games 2008 Summer Olympics, World League (2013, 2014) and silver medalist of European Championship (2011, 2013).

Career
Birarelli was born at Senigallia. He debuted in the Italian top championship in 1998 for Pallavolo Falconara. He remained there until 2003, when he was diagnosed  an  arm ischemia which forced him away from the field for two years.

He returned to play volleyball in 2005, first at Pineto, then for Verona and, from 2007, for Trentino Volley, with which he won an Italian national title in 2008. In the same year he debuted for  Italy's national team. In 2009, he won the CEV Champions League with Trentino Volley, a feat he repeated the following year. He achieved bronze medal at the 2012 Summer Olympics.
In 2015, he left Trentino Volley after eight seasons and went to another Italian club Sir Safety Perugia.
He was a member of the Italy at the 2016 Summer Olympics and won silver medal after lost finale against Brazil. Birarelli received individual award for the Best Middle Blocker.

After retirement from the sports, he turned into volleyball agent to seek talent young players.

Sporting achievements

CEV Champions League
  2008/2009 - with Itas Diates Trentino
  2009/2010 - with Itas Diates Trentino
  2010/2011 - with Itas Diates Trentino
  2011/2012 - with Itas Diates Trentino
  2016/2017 - with Sir Sicoma Colussi Perugia

FIVB Club World Championship
  Qatar 2009 - with Itas Diates Trentino
  Qatar 2010 - with Itas Diates Trentino
  Qatar 2011 - with Itas Diates Trentino
  Qatar 2012 - with Itas Diates Trentino

National championship
 2007/2008  Italian Championship, with Itas Diates Trentino
 2008/2009  Italian Championship, with Itas Diates Trentino
 2009/2010  Italian Cup Serie A, with Itas Diates Trentino
 2009/2010  Italian Championship, with Itas Diates Trentino
 2010/2011  Italian Championship, with Itas Diates Trentino
 2011/2012  Italian Cup Serie A, with Itas Diates Trentino
 2011/2012  Italian Championship, with Itas Diates Trentino
 2012/2013  Italian Cup Serie A, with Itas Diates Trentino
 2012/2013  Italian Championship, with Itas Diates Trentino
 2014/2015  Italian Championship, with Trentino Volley

National team
 2011  CEV European Championship
 2012  Olympic Games
 2013  FIVB World League
 2013  CEV European Championship
 2014  FIVB World League
 2016  Olympic Games

Individual
 2012 FIVB Club World Championship - Best Blocker
 2013 FIVB World League - Best Middle Blocker
 2013 FIVB Club World Championship - Best Middle Blocker
 2013 FIVB World Grand Champions Cup - Best Middle Blocker
 2016 Olympic Games - Best Middle Blocker

References

External links

 LegaVolley Serie A player profile
 
 
 
 

1981 births
Living people
People from Senigallia
Sportspeople from the Province of Ancona
Italian men's volleyball players
Blu Volley Verona players
Trentino Volley players
Volleyball players at the 2008 Summer Olympics
Volleyball players at the 2012 Summer Olympics
Medalists at the 2012 Summer Olympics
Olympic medalists in volleyball
Olympic volleyball players of Italy
Olympic bronze medalists for Italy
Volleyball players at the 2016 Summer Olympics
Medalists at the 2016 Summer Olympics
Olympic silver medalists for Italy
Middle blockers